Andrea Austmo Pedersen (born 19 April 1994) is a Norwegian handball player for Vipers Kristiansand and the Norwegian national team.

She also represented Norway in the 2013 Women's Junior European Handball Championship, placing 4th, and in the 2014 Women's Junior World Handball Championship, placing 9th.

Achievements
Youth European Championship:
Bronze Medalist: 2011
Youth World Championship:
Bronze Medalist: 2012
EHF Champions League:
Winner: 2020/2021, 2021/2022
Norwegian League:
Winner: 2019/2020, 2020/2021, 2021/2022
Norwegian Cup:
Winner: 2019, 2020, 2021

References

External links

1994 births
Living people
Sportspeople from Trondheim
Norwegian female handball players
21st-century Norwegian women